Bama-Gruppen AS is Norway's largest private distributor of fruit and vegetables. Bama-Gruppen is engaged in wholesale trading of imported and Norwegian-produced fresh produce in fruits, vegetables and flowers.

The corporation was founded as Chr. Matthiessen AS in 1886 when Christian Marius Emil Matthiessen (1850–1918) from Kristiansand started a lumber business. Banana imports began in 1905 as the first in Europe outside the UK. The company was eventually named Banana Matthiessen.  In 1981, the corporate name was changed to Bama-Gruppen AS.

The company has five divisions: retail, industry, institutions, flowers and convenience shops. On the retail market it delivers produce to the two wholesalers Norgesgruppen and Reitangruppen.  Bama is the main sponsor of the Norway national football team.

References

External links
Bama Gruppen AS official website

Food and drink companies of Norway
Food and drink companies established in 1886
1886 establishments in Norway